Margaret Ashmore Sudduth (June 29, 1859 – September 21, 1957) was an American educator, editor, and temperance advocate. She was the senior editor upon the staff of the Woman's Temperance Publishing Association, overseeing The Union Signal.

Sudduth was called in July 1887 to a position as editor of Oak and Ivy Leaf, organ of the Young Woman's Christian Temperance Union (Y. W. C. T. U.), and soon became associate editor of The Union Signal also. In 1892, on her appointment as managing editor of The Union Signal, she resigned her connection with the young woman's paper.

Early life and education
Margaret Ashmore Sudduth was born on a farm in Mason County, Illinois, June 29, 1959. Her parents were Dr. James McCreary Sudduth (1827–1895) and Amanda Elizabeth Sudduth (1828–1898). She had two siblings, a brother, Dr. William Xavier Sudduth, and a sister, Alice Sudduth Byerly. Her father had built up an extensive practice in Central Illinois before giving up the practice of medicine to become a banker and stock raiser.

Sudduth received a B.S. degree in 1880 from Illinois Wesleyan University.

Career
During the year 1880, she was assistant principal of the high school at Dwight, Illinois, and in the fall of 1881, she entered Wellesley College for a teacher's special course of literature and history, where she remained but a few months, being compelled to give up study on account of failing eyesight. Having traveled extensively with members of her family in the South and West, she went abroad in May, 1886, and spent fourteen months in Europe, traveling through England, Germany, Austria, Italy, and Switzerland, making special study of the German language.

Interested since before her graduation in the temperance movement, she spent considerable time while abroad in investigating the cause of drunkenness in the countries visited, and as a special correspondent to Bloomington, Illinois papers and the Union Signal, she displayed  literary ability. In 1887, upon her return to the United States, she accepted the editorship of the Oak and Ivy Leaf, a publication projected by Mary Allen West.

In 1890, her name first appeared as an editor of the Union Signal, to which her services had been rendered from the time of her arrival in Chicago, and in January, 1892, she assumed the managing editorship, where her journalistic ability and cultured mental and literary qualifications were called into requisition.

Death
Margaret Ashmore Sudduth died in Los Angeles County, California, September 21, 1957, and was buried at Olivewood Memorial Park, Riverside, California.

References

Attribution

Bibliography
 

1859 births
1957 deaths
People from Mason County, Illinois
Writers from Illinois
Educators from Illinois
American women educators
Woman's Christian Temperance Union people
19th-century American newspaper editors
Women newspaper editors
Illinois Wesleyan University alumni
Wellesley College alumni
19th-century women writers
Burials at Olivewood Memorial Park
19th-century American women